Ayo Akínwándé (born in Lagos, Nigeria) is a Nigerian contemporary visual artist, curator, and writer. He is known for his vivid multimedia drawings and works on paper.

Early life and education 
Ayo Akínwándé was born and brought up in Lagos, Nigeria. He studied Architecture from Covenant University Nigeria.

Exhibitions 
Selected solo exhibitions:

 Power Show III - The God-Fathers Must Be Crazy, Darling Foundry  Montreal Quebec, Canada 2019.
 the artist isn't present, The Gallow Gate, Glasgow 2019.
 Power Show II: The God-Fathers Are Not To Blame,  Revolving Art Incubator, Lagos (Nigeria) 2018.
 Power Show I, Omenka Gallery, Lagos (Nigeria) 2018.
 Deaf vs Dumb II, National Museum, Lagos 2017.

Publications 

 2019 “Victor Ehikhamenor: From the Village to the World, and Back Again”, The Art Momentum.
 2018 Confronting an Unaddressed Nigerian Reality in the Exhibition ‘Salvage Therapy’ The Sole Adventurer.
 2020 "Who Art Exhibition Epp?”, People's Stories Project.

See also 

 Lemi Ghariokwu
 Ade Adekola

References

External links 

  Ayo Akinwande Official website

Date of birth missing (living people)
Living people
21st-century Nigerian artists
21st-century Nigerian painters
Nigerian printmakers
Yoruba artists
People from Lagos
Year of birth missing (living people)
Covenant University alumni
Residents of Lagos